Port Gibson is a city in Claiborne County, Mississippi, United States. The population was 1,567 at the 2010 census. Port Gibson is the county seat of Claiborne County, which is bordered on the west by the Mississippi River. It is the site of the Claiborne County Courthouse.

The first European settlers in Port Gibson were French colonists in 1729; it was part of their La Louisiane. After the United States acquired the territory from France in 1803 in the Louisiana Purchase, the town was chartered that same year. To develop cotton plantations in the area after Indian Removal of the 1830s, planters who moved to the state brought with them or imported thousands of enslaved African Americans from the Upper South, disrupting many families. Well before the Civil War, the majority of the county's population were enslaved.

Several notable people are natives of Port Gibson. The town saw action during the American Civil War. Port Gibson has several historical sites listed on the National Register of Historic Places (National Register of Historic Places listings in Claiborne County, Mississippi).

In the twentieth century, Port Gibson was home to The Rabbit's Foot Company. It had a substantial role in the development of blues in Mississippi, operating taverns and juke joints now included on the Mississippi Blues Trail.

With the decline in agricultural jobs since the late twentieth century, because of industrial agriculture, and a lack of other jobs, the city and surrounding rural county have suffered from reduced population and long-term poverty. The peak of population in the city was in 1950. The last major employer, the Port Gibson Oil Works, a cottonseed mill, closed in 2002.

History 

Port Gibson is the third-oldest European-American settlement in Mississippi. Its development began in 1729 by French colonists and was then within French-claimed territory known as La Louisiane. The British acquired this area after the French ceded their colonies east of the Mississippi River in 1763, following their defeat in the Seven Years' War.

Following the U.S. acquisition of former French territory through the Louisiana Purchase of 1803, more Americans entered the area. Port Gibson was chartered as a town that year on March 12, 1803. The federal government carried out Indian Removal in the 1830s, pushing the Five Civilized Tribes, including the Choctaw and Chickasaw peoples, west of the Mississippi River to Indian Territory. It took over their lands in the Southeast for sale and development by European Americans.

Planters developed cotton plantations in the fertile river lowlands of the Mississippi Delta and other riverfront areas, dependent on the labor of enslaved African Americans, initially brought from the Upper South. The African Americans comprised a majority in the county before the Civil War, and this continued.

With international demand high for cotton, such planters prospered. As the planter population increased, they founded the Port Gibson Female College in 1843 to educate their daughters. The college later closed and one of its buildings now serves as the city hall. Similarly, they founded Chamberlain-Hunt Academy in 1879, a military boarding school for white male youths. It operated into the early twenty-first century.

Port Gibson was the site of several clashes during the American Civil War and figured in Union General Ulysses S. Grant's Vicksburg Campaign. He was attempting to gain control over the Mississippi River. The Battle of Port Gibson occurred on May 1, 1863, and resulted in the deaths of more than 200 Union and Confederate soldiers. The Confederate defeat resulted in their losing the ability to hold Mississippi and defend against an amphibious attack.

Later nineteenth century to present 
Reportedly, many of the historic buildings in the town survived the Civil War because Grant proclaimed the city to be "too beautiful to burn". These words appear on the sign marking the city limits.

Despite postwar economic upheaval, the city continued as a center of trade and economy associated with cotton. In 1882, the Port Gibson Oil Works started operating, established as one of the first cottonseed oil plants in the United States. This historic industrial building was listed on the National Register of Historic Places in 1979. The mill finally closed in 2002.

Gemiluth Chessed synagogue, built in 1892, had an active congregation when the town was thriving as the county seat and a trading center. It had attracted nineteenth-century Jewish immigrants from the German states and Alsace-Lorraine. After starting as peddlers, the later generations of men became cotton brokers and merchants. This is the oldest synagogue and the only Moorish Revival building in the state. It is topped by a Russian-style dome. As the economy changed, the Jewish population gradually moved to larger cities and areas offering more opportunity, and none remain in Port Gibson.

The Rabbit's Foot Company was established in 1900 by Pat Chappelle, an African-American theatre owner in Tampa, Florida. This was the leading traveling vaudeville show in the southern states, with an all-black cast of singers, musicians, comedians, and entertainers.

After Chappelle's death in 1911, the company was taken over by Fred Swift Wolcott, a white planter. After 1918, he based the touring company at his plantation near Port Gibson, with offices in town. He continued to manage it until 1950, when he sold it. The Rabbit's Foot Company remained popular, but as some white performers joined and used blackface, it was no longer considered "authentic".

In 2002 the New York Times characterized Port Gibson as 80 percent black and poor, with 20 percent of families living on incomes of less than $10,000 a year, according to the 2000 Census. It also had an "entrenched population of whites, many of whom are related and have some historical connection to cotton".

Legacy 
A Mississippi Blues Trail marker was placed in Port Gibson to commemorate the contribution the Rabbit's Foot Company made to the development of the blues in Mississippi, in its decades of operation after the founder's death.

In 2006, an exhibition, The Blues in Claiborne County: From Rabbit Foot Minstrels to Blues and Cruise, was shown in Port Gibson, exploring the history of the show, with artifacts and memorabilia.

Other National Register of Historic Places buildings and sites 
Van Dorn House, completed c. 1830, built by Peter Aaron Van Dorn, a lawyer, planter, and judge 
McGregor, house designed in Greek Revival style by Van Dorn (above) for one of his daughters, completed 1835
Windsor Ruins, 23 columns of a plantation house that burned c. 1890, located about ten miles southwest of the city that have been featured in two motion pictures
Wintergreen Cemetery, historic cemetery with burials of notable residents

Geography

Demographics

2020 census

As of the 2020 United States Census, there were 1,269 people, 554 households, and 290 families residing in the city.

2000 census
As of the census of 2000, there were 1,840 people, 692 households, and 447 families residing in the city. The population density was 1,048.0 people per square mile (403.7/km2). There were 787 housing units at an average density of 448.2 per square mile (172.6/km2). The racial makeup of the city was 19.40% White, 80.00% African American, 0.05% Native American, 0.22% Asian, 0.05% from other races, and 0.27% from two or more races. Hispanic or Latino people of any race were 0.71% of the population.

There were 692 households, out of which 30.6% had children under the age of 18 living with them, 31.9% were married couples living together, 27.2% had a female householder with no husband present, and 35.3% were non-families. 30.8% of all households were made up of individuals, and 13.9% had someone living alone who was 65 years of age or older. The average household size was 2.64 and the average family size was 3.33.

In the city, the population was spread out, with 29.3% under the age of 18, 10.5% from 18 to 24, 24.7% from 25 to 44, 20.9% from 45 to 64, and 14.5% who were 65 years of age or older. The median age was 34 years. For every 100 females, there were 80.2 males. For every 100 females age 18 and over, there were 76.2 males.

The median income for a household in the city was $24,848, and the median income for a family was $28,958. Males had a median income of $28,036 versus $21,115 for females. The per capita income for the city was $12,928. About 26.0% of families and 31.3% of the population were below the poverty line, including 41.9% of those under age 18 and 26.3% of those age 65 or over.

Education 
Port Gibson is served by the Claiborne County School District. Port Gibson High School is the comprehensive high school of the district.

The Chamberlain-Hunt Academy, a private military boarding school, has operated in Port Gibson since 1879. It was promoted as a Christian school in the late twentieth century. Nonetheless, it suffered declining enrollment and closed in 2014.

Notable people 
 Samuel Reading Bertron, banker
 Cleo W. Blackburn, educator 
 Pete Brown, golfer, first African American to win on the PGA Tour
 Jay Disharoon, lawyer and Mississippi legislator
 Constance Cary Harrison, author
 Henry Hughes, lawyer, sociologist, state senator, and Confederate colonel
 Yolanda Moore, former professional basketball player and girls basketball coach 
 Irwin Russell, poet
 Bob Shannon, high school football coach, known for his work in East St. Louis, Illinois
 V. C. Shannon, born in Port Gibson in 1910, one-term member of the Louisiana House of Representatives from Shreveport, serving from 1972 to 1974
 J. D. Short, Delta blues guitarist, singer, and harmonicist
 James G. Spencer, U.S. Representative from 1895 to 1897 
 Clement Sulivane, Confederate officer, politician, and member of the Maryland Senate from 1878 to 1880 
 Earl Van Dorn, Confederate Civil War general
 Peter Aaron Van Dorn, lawyer, judge, plantation owner, and one of the founders of Jackson, Mississippi
 F. S. Wolcott, minstrel show proprietor

See also 

 NAACP v. Claiborne Hardware Co.

References

External links 

 
 Southern Lagniappe site - many architectural images
 History of Port Gibson's Jewish community (from the Institute of Southern Jewish Life) (Archive)
 The Battle of Port Gibson
 Port Gibson on the Mississippi